Lorgio Álvarez Roca (born June 29, 1978 in Santa Cruz de la Sierra) is a Bolivian former footballer. He last played for Blooming in the Liga de Fútbol Profesional Boliviano.

His previous clubs include Oriente Petrolero and Bolívar in Bolivia, Club Atlético Independiente in Argentina, as well as Cerro Porteño and Libertad in Paraguay.

International career
From 1999 to 2011 Álvarez earned a total of 45 caps in the Bolivia national team. He played in Copa América 2001, 2004 and 2007. He scored a spectacular goal in a match against Peru during the Copa América 2004.

Honours

Club
 Blooming
 Liga de Fútbol Profesional Boliviano: 1998, 1999, 2009 Clausura
 Cerro Porteño
 Primera División de Paraguay: 2005
 Libertad
 Primera División de Paraguay: 2008 (Apertura and Clausura)
 Bolívar
 Liga de Fútbol Profesional Boliviano: 2011 AD, 2013 (C), 2014 (A) & 2015 (C)

References
 Bolivia record international footballers

External links
 Argentine Primera statistics at Fútbol XXI  
 
 
 

1978 births
Living people
Sportspeople from Santa Cruz de la Sierra
Bolivian footballers
Bolivian expatriate footballers
Bolivia international footballers
Association football midfielders
Club Atlético Independiente footballers
Club Blooming players
Oriente Petrolero players
Cerro Porteño players
Club Libertad footballers
Club Bolívar players
Expatriate footballers in Argentina
Expatriate footballers in Paraguay
Argentine Primera División players
Bolivian expatriate sportspeople in Argentina
Bolivian expatriate sportspeople in Paraguay
1999 FIFA Confederations Cup players
2001 Copa América players
2004 Copa América players
2007 Copa América players
2011 Copa América players